The 2004–05 First League of the Federation of Bosnia and Herzegovina season was the fifth since its establishment.

League standings

References

External links
 Futbol24.com
 RSSSF.org

First League of the Federation of Bosnia and Herzegovina seasons
Bosnia
2004–05 in Bosnia and Herzegovina football